Xavier Clarke (born 28 September 1983) is a former Australian rules football player who played for St Kilda and Brisbane Lions in the Australian Football League (AFL).

Early life
Clarke has Indigenous Australian heritage and his ancestry can be traced to the Gambalang people of the Daly River region of the Northern Territory. Originally from Darwin-based St Mary's Football Club in the Northern Territory Football League (NTFL), Clarke was a leading junior player and was tipped to be a first round choice at the 2001 AFL Draft.

Playing career
Clarke was selected by St Kilda with their first round choice, the fifth overall, in the 2001 AFL Draft was presented with the number 20 guernsey and made his senior AFL debut in the 2002 AFL season, where he was nominated as an AFL Rising Star. Clarke's brother Raphael was also drafted by St Kilda, as Clarke played 57 games during his first three seasons, taking over the number 3 guernsey from former St Kilda captain Nathan Burke when Burke retired at the end of the 2003 AFL season.

In 2005 Clarke he struggled in form and his season ended early when he injured his hamstring in Round 17 against Collingwood. Clarke continued to struggle with injuries for the rest of his AFL career and following the 2009 AFL season a deal was struck between St Kilda and Brisbane in which Clarke transferred to Brisbane in exchange for draft pick number 60 in the 2009 AFL Draft.

Clarke played his only game for Brisbane in the Round 18, 2010 loss to Melbourne Football Club at Brisbane's home ground, the Gabba. Clarke suffered a recurrence of his hamstring injury in the first half, and while he was originally ruled out for a week, Clarke did not play again.

In 2011, Clarke almost completed a full preseason when he ruptured his anterior cruciate ligament in his right knee and, although offered a rookie list position by Brisbane, retired from football at the end of the 2011 season.

Coaching career
Clarke became head coach of the NT Thunder in the NEAFL in 2014. He won the league's Coach of the Year award that season before taking them to a premiership in 2015. In 2017 he joined  as a VFL assistant coach. In 2020 he will serve as head coach of the club's VFL side.

Honours and achievements
 NEAFL Premiership Coach: 2015
 NEAFL Coach of the Year: 2014
 NT Sports Awards Coach of the Year: 2016

Other work
Clarke has also worked with the AFL and the AFL Players Association (AFLPA) in Indigenous engagement and was a founding director of the Unity Foundation which worked to provide housing and support for homeless Indigenous youth.

References

External links

1983 births
Living people
St Kilda Football Club players
Brisbane Lions players
Australian rules footballers from the Northern Territory
St Mary's Football Club (NTFL) players
Indigenous Australian players of Australian rules football
Casey Demons players
Sandringham Football Club players
West Preston Football Club players
Sportspeople from Darwin, Northern Territory